Highstead is a village near Chislet, off the A299 road, in the Canterbury District, in the English county of Kent. It is near the town of Herne Bay. Highstead is known for its iron-age pottery findings.

References 

 http://getamap.ordnancesurvey.co.uk/getamap/frames.htm  (result for Highstead)

Villages in Kent
City of Canterbury